Christoph Andreas Mangold (1719, Erfurt – 2 July 1767, Erfurt)  was a German professor of anatomy at the University of Jena, who also studied chemistry.

Christoph Mangold received his Doctor of Medicine degree from the University of Erfurt in 1751. He was a member of the Academie der Wissenschaften of Erfurt.
 
Mangold is known for his studies of gunpowder and cinnabar as well as the idea that medical diagnosis should be based upon symptoms, laboratory tests, and comparisons with other patients. He was notably the advisor of Ernst Gottfried Baldinger.

Works
 Chymische Erfahrungen und Vortheile in Bereitung einiger sehr bewährter Arzneymittel : nebst verschiedenen physicalischen Anmerkungen über dieselben . Nonne, Erfurt 1748 Digital edition by the University and State Library Düsseldorf
 Fortgesetzte chymische Erfahrungen und Vortheile : bestehend vornemlich in einer gründlicheen und abgenöthigten Widerlegung der bisher siegenden, nunmehr aber in letzten Zügen liegenden Chymie des Herrtn Prof. Ludolffs, und in einigen in der Arzneykunst nützlichen Versuchen . Beumelburg, Frankfurt [u.a.] 1749 Digital edition by the University and State Library Düsseldorf

References

1719 births
1767 deaths
Scientists from Erfurt
University of Erfurt alumni
Academic staff of the University of Jena
18th-century German physicians
German anatomists
18th-century German chemists